Elemér Thury (3 April 1874 – 21 June 1944) was a Hungarian film actor. He appeared in 14 films between 1912 and 1944. He was born in Mezőtúr, Hungary and died in Budapest.

Selected filmography
 Utolsó bohém, Az (1912)
 Rablélek (1913)
 Drakula halála (1923)

External links

1874 births
1944 deaths
People from Mezőtúr
Hungarian male film actors
Hungarian male silent film actors
20th-century Hungarian male actors
Male actors from the Austro-Hungarian Empire